Pliciloricus is a genus of marine organisms Pliciloricidae family, the phylum Loricifera described by Higgins & Kristensen, 1986.

Species 
 Pliciloricus cavernicola Heiner, Boesgaard & Kristensen, 2009
 Pliciloricus corvus Gad, 2005
 Pliciloricus diva Gad, 2009
 Pliciloricus dubius Higgins & Kristensen, 1986
 Pliciloricus enigmaticus Higgins & Kristensen, 1986
 Pliciloricus gracilis Higgins & Kristensen, 1986
 Pliciloricus hadalis Kristensen & Shirayama, 1988
 Pliciloricus leocaudatus Heiner & Kristensen, 2005
 Pliciloricus orphanus Higgins & Kristensen, 1986
 Pliciloricus pedicularis Gad, 2005
 Pliciloricus profundus Higgins & Kristensen, 1986
 Pliciloricus senicirrus Gad, 2005
 Pliciloricus shukeri Heiner & Kristensen, 2005

References

External links 

 Integrated Taxonomic Information System (ITIS): Pliciloricus Higgins and Kristensen, 1986 Taxonomic Serial No.: 202428
 Animañ Diversity Web: Pliciloricus
 The Tree of Life: Loricifera
 Index to Organism Name (ION): Pliciloricus
 Nomenclator Zoologicus: Pliciloricus

Loricifera